Foothills County is a municipal district in southern Alberta, Canada adjacent to the south side of Calgary in Census Division No. 6. Despite sharing a common border with the City of Calgary, it does not form part of the Calgary census metropolitan area (CMA) as defined by Statistics Canada. It is however a member municipality of the Calgary Metropolitan Region Board.

History 
Foothills County was originally formed as the Municipal District (MD) of Sheep River No. 31 on January 1, 1954 through the amalgamation of portions of Improvement District No. 46 and the MDs of Highwood No. 31, Turner Valley No. 32, and Springbank No. 45. Its name was changed to the MD of Foothills No. 31 shortly thereafter on March 25, 1954. Foothills County assumed its present name on January 1, 2019.

Geography

Communities and localities 
The following urban municipalities are surrounded by Foothills County.
Cities
none
Towns
Diamond Valley
High River
Okotoks
Villages
Longview
Summer villages
 none

The following hamlets are located within Foothills County.
Aldersyde
Blackie
Cayley
De Winton
Heritage Pointe
Millarville
Priddis
Priddis Greens

The following localities are located within Foothills County.
Localities

Alder Heights
Aspen Creek Estates
Azure
Black Diamond
Caravelle Estates
Connemara
De Winton Heights
Eltham
Gladys
Hartell
Kew
Leduc Lynnwood Ranch

Leisure Lake
Mazeppa
Naphtha
Naptha
Pekisko
Pineridge Estates
Rio Frio
Royalties
Sandstone
Turner Valley
Valleyview Acres

Demographics 

In the 2016 Census of Population conducted by Statistics Canada, Foothills County had a population of 22,766 living in 8,156 of its 8,689 total private dwellings, a  change from its 2011 population of 21,248.

Attractions 
Big Rock
High River Airport
De Winton/South Calgary Airport
Frank Lake
Spruce Meadows

See also 
List of communities in Alberta
List of municipal districts in Alberta

References

External links 

Calgary Region

Foothills